Duochrome may refer to:

Duochrome test
Duochrome nail polish
Duochrome (album) Dave Cousins 2008